McShea is a surname. Notable people with the surname include:

Joseph Mark McShea, DD (1907–1991), American prelate of the Roman Catholic Church
Kate McShea (born 1983), Australian football (soccer) player
Robert J. McShea (1917–1997), Professor of Political Science, Emeritus, at Boston University
Lisa McShea (born 1974), Australian tennis player